Since the 1968 Summer Olympics did not feature tennis as an official sport, two unofficial tournaments were held during the Games: a Demonstration tournament and an Exhibition tournament.

The Demonstration tournament was played from 14 to 20 October 1968 at three venues in Guadalajara, Mexico: Guadalajara Country Club, Atlas Sports Club and Guadalajara Sports Club; all of them featured clay courts. All matches were played at best-of-three sets; since the tiebreak rule wasn't implemented until the 1970s, a team had to win a set by a two-game margin in case of a 6–6 draw.

West Germans Edda Buding and Helga Niessen won the tournament by defeating French Rosa María Darmon and American Julie Heldman 6–3, 6–4 in the final. Americans Peaches Bartkowicz and Valerie Ziegenfuss won the third place.

Seeds
Both seeds received a bye into the semifinals.

Draw

References

External links
 Official Results Archive (ITF)

1968
Demonstration
Women's events at the 1968 Summer Olympics
Olym